The Republic and Canton of Jura, less formally the Canton of Jura or Canton Jura, is the newest (founded in 1979) of the 26 Swiss cantons, located in the northwestern part of Switzerland. The capital is Delémont. It shares borders with the canton of Basel-Landschaft, the canton of Bern, the canton of Neuchatel, the canton of Solothurn, and the French régions of Bourgogne-Franche-Comté and Grand Est.

History

The king of Burgundy donated much of the land that today makes up canton Jura to the bishop of Basel in 999. The area was a sovereign state within the Holy Roman Empire for more than 800 years. After the Treaty of Westphalia in 1648 the Jura had close ties with the Swiss Confederation. 
At the Congress of Vienna (1815), the Jura region became part of the canton of Bern. This act caused dissension. The Jura was French-speaking and Roman Catholic, whereas the canton of Bern was mostly German-speaking and Protestant.

After World War II, a separatist movement campaigned for a secession of Jura from the canton of Bern. After a long and partly militant struggle, which included some arson attacks by a youth organisation Les Béliers, a constitution was accepted in 1977. In 1978, the split was made official when the Swiss people voted in favour, and in 1979, the Jura joined the Swiss Confederation as a full member. The canton celebrated its independence from the canton of Bern on 23 June. However, the southern part of the region, which is also predominantly French-speaking but has a Protestant majority, opted not to join the newly formed canton, instead remaining part of the canton of Bern. The area is now known as Bernese Jura. The word Jura, therefore, may refer either to canton Jura, or to the combined territory of canton Jura and the Bernese Jura. Switzerland as a whole often presents the latter from a touristic standpoint with documentation easily available in French or German.

On creation, the canton adopted the title Republic and Canton of Jura. Other cantons in Switzerland using the title "Republic and Canton" are Ticino, Geneva, and Neuchâtel. In each case, the title refers to the autonomy of the canton and its nominal sovereignty within the Swiss Confederation.

Since 1994, the question of the Jura region has again been controversial. In 2004, a federal commission proposed that the French-speaking southern Jura be united with the canton of Jura, as the language question now seems to be more important than the denominational one. A possible solution would be to create two half-cantons, as reunification with the creation of only a single canton would mean a complete restructuring of the Jura's current political system, with the cantonal capital being transferred from Delémont to Moutier.

On 18 June 2017, the town of Moutier voted to secede from the canton of Bern and join the canton of Jura in a referendum. On 17 September 2017, the nearby municipalities of Belprahon and Sorvilier conversely voted to remain in the canton of Bern.  The vote in Moutier was later declared invalid. On 28 March 2021, Moutier voted to secede from Bern and join Jura again in an officially sanctioned referendum. The changeover is expected to be implemented by 2026.

Geography
Canton Jura lies in the northwest of Switzerland. It consists of parts of the Jura mountains in the south and the Jura plateau in the north. The Jura plateau is hilly and almost entirely limestone. The districts of Ajoie and Franches-Montagnes lie in this region.  The term "Jurassic" is derived from the Jura Alps, strata of which give the era its name.

To the north and the west of the canton lies France. The canton of Solothurn and Basel-Landschaft are to east of the canton, while the canton of Bern bounds the Jura to the south. The rivers Doubs and the Birs drain the lands. The Doubs joins the Saône and then the Rhône, whereas the Birs is a tributary to the Rhine.

Political subdivisions

Districts

Jura is divided into 3 districts:
Delémont - capital: Delémont
Porrentruy - capital: Porrentruy
Franches-Montagnes - capital: Saignelégier

Municipalities

There are 53 municipalities in the canton.

Politics

Federal election results

 RDP before 2009
 "*" indicates that the party was not on the ballot in this canton.
 Part of the canton of Bern

Demographics
The population is almost entirely French-speaking. Just one municipality is German-speaking: Ederswiler. The majority of the population is Roman Catholic (75% ) with a small Protestant minority (13%). , the population included 8,195 foreigners, or about 11.8% of the total population.

Historic population
The historical population is given in the following chart:

Economy
Agriculture is important in canton Jura. Cattle breeding is significant, but there is also horse breeding (the Franches-Montagnes is the last Swiss horse race). The main industries are watches, textiles and tobacco. There is a growing number of small and medium-sized businesses.  In 2001, there were 3,578 people who worked in the primary economic sector.  14,109 people were employed in the secondary sector and 16,513 people were employed in the tertiary sector.

In 2001, the canton produced 0.9% of the entire Swiss national income while it had 0.9% of the total population.  In 2005, the average share of the national income per resident of the canton was 38,070 CHF, while the national average was 54,031 CHF, or about 70% of the national income per person.  Between 2003 and 2005, the average income grew at a rate of 6.4%, which was larger than the national rate of 5.3%.  The average taxes in the canton are higher than in most cantons, in 2006, the tax index in the canton was 126.6 (Swiss average is 100.0).  In 2006, the canton had the highest final tax rate on high wage earners (15.26% on a married couple with two children earning 150,000 CHF vs 11.6% nationally), though the tax rate was in the middle for lower-income families.

Culture 
The eau de vie Damassine is one typical produce of the Ajoie area. (see 今日のデリヘル嬢 Terroir Jura and
Accueil Jura Infos)

See also
 Frainc-Comtou dialect 
 Franco-Provençal language

Notes and references

Bibliography 
 Ganguillet, Gilbert: Le conflit jurassien. Un cas de mobilisation ethno-régionale en Suisse, Zürich 1986.
 Harder, Hans-Joachim: Der Kanton Jura. Ursachen und Schritte zur Lösung eines Schweizer Minderheitenproblems, Frankfurt am Main 1978.
 Hauser, Claude: Aux origines intellectuelles de la Question jurassienne. Culture et politique entre la France et la Suisse romande (1910–1950), Diss. Fribourg 1997.
 Henecka, Hans Peter: Die jurassischen Separatisten. Eine Studie zur Soziologie des ethnischen Konflikts und der sozialen Bewegung, Meisenheim am Glan 1972.
 Jenkins, John R.G.: Jura Separatism in Switzerland, Oxford 1986.
 Ruch, Christian: Struktur und Strukturwandel des jurassischen Separatismus zwischen 1974 und 1994, Bern 2001.
 Schwander, Marcel: Jura. Konfliktstoff für Jahrzehnte, Zürich/Köln 1977.
 Steppacher, Burkard: Die Jurafrage in der Schweiz, München 1985.

External links

 Republic and Canton of Jura  official site
 Jura Tourism
 Watch Valley
 Official statistics

 
Jura
1979 establishments in Switzerland
States and territories established in 1979